Brachyopa dorsata is a species of hoverfly found in Europe.

Distribution
Sweden, Denmark.

References

Diptera of Europe
Eristalinae
Insects described in 1837
Taxa named by Johan Wilhelm Zetterstedt